Linda F. Sanborn (born December 30, 1951) is an American physician and politician from Maine. Sanborn, a Democrat from Gorham, Maine, served in the Maine House of Representatives from December 2008 until December 2016.

Sanborn was born in Aurora, Illinois and earned a B.S. from Michigan State University in 1974 and her M.D. at the University of Illinois at Chicago in 1978.

References

1951 births
Living people
People from Aurora, Illinois
People from Gorham, Maine
Democratic Party members of the Maine House of Representatives
Women state legislators in Maine
Physicians from Maine
American women physicians
Michigan State University alumni
University of Illinois Chicago alumni
21st-century American politicians
21st-century American women politicians
Democratic Party Maine state senators